The 1997–98 season was the 96th in the history of the Western Football League.

The league champions for the fourth time in their history (and the fourth time in five seasons) were Tiverton Town, who finished the season unbeaten. The champions of Division One were Bishop Sutton.

Final tables

Premier Division
The Premier Division was increased from 18 to 20 clubs after there was no relegation to the First Division last season. Two clubs joined:

Keynsham Town, runners-up in the First Division.
Melksham Town, champions of the First Division.

First Division
The First Division was reduced from 20 clubs to 19, after Keynsham Town and Melksham Town were promoted to the Premier Division, and Amesbury Town left the league. Two clubs joined:

Bitton, promoted from the Gloucestershire County League.
Street, promoted from the Somerset Senior League – rejoining after leaving the league in 1960.

References

1997-98
6